Coyoteville is a former settlement in Nevada County, California.

History
On the eastern section of Lost Hill, the town of Coyoteville started in an area of gravel hills that were rich with gold. During the California Gold Rush, a tunneling method, nicknamed "coyoteing" was developed here, leading to the town's naming.

In later years, Coyoteville became the northwestern portion of Nevada City, California.

References

Former settlements in Nevada County, California
Former populated places in California